Tuole Railway Station is a railway station on the Qingzang railway in the People's Republic of China. It serves Tulai and is located 147 km from Xining Railway Station.

See also
List of stations on Qingzang railway

Railway stations in Qinghai
Stations on the Qinghai–Tibet Railway